Dabo is a rural commune in the Cercle of Nara in the Koulikoro Region of south-western Mali. The commune contains 10 villages and had a population of 11,855 in the 2009 census. The main village is Boulal.

References

External links
.

Communes of Koulikoro Region